The 1973–74 Kentucky Colonels season was their seventh in the American Basketball Association. The Colonels finished in second place in the ABA's Eastern Division. They met the Carolina Cougars in the Eastern Division Semifinals and swept them in 4 games. They met the eventual champion New York Nets in the Eastern Division Finals, where they lost. McCarthy was let go after this season.

Offseason

Special circumstances draft

Senior draft picks

Undergraduate and supplemental draft

Preseason transactions

On July 31, 1973, the Kentucky Colonels were bought by future Governor of Kentucky John Y. Brown, Jr. and other investors. Famed college coach Adolph Rupp was hired as Vice President of the Board. General Manager Mike Storen resigned and was replaced by Gene Rhodes. Head coach Joe Mullaney left the team in order to become head coach of the Utah Stars and Babe McCarthy was hired as Mullaney's replacement.

Preseason exhibition games

Like most ABA teams, the Colonels played several preseason exhibition games against NBA opponents. The first for the 1973–74 preseason came on September 21, 1973, on the Colonels' home court at Freedom Hall in Louisville against the Houston Rockets. Rudy Tomjanovich scored 32 points for the Bulls. Center Artis Gilmore had 22 points and 18 rebounds for the Colonels; his teammate, forward Dan Issel, scored 20. The Colonels won, 110–102.

The next night the Colonels hosted the Kansas City–Omaha Kings. Rick Mount scored 21 points for the Kings; his teammate Nate Archibald scored 19. Guard Louie Dampier led the Colonels with 22 points and Kentucky won 110–99.

Regular season

Roster
 2   Walt Simon
 3  Joe Hamilton
 10  Louie Dampier
 22  Collis Jones
 25  Jim Bradley
 44  Dan Issel
 8  Ron Thomas
 9  Red Robbins
 11  John Roche
 15  Chuck Williams
 53  Artis Gilmore

Season standings

Game log

|-
||  ||  ||  || || ||  ||
|-

|-
||  ||  ||  || || ||  ||
|-

|-
||  ||  ||  || || ||  ||
|-

|-
||  ||  ||  || || ||  ||
|-
|-

|-
||  ||  ||  || || ||  ||
|-
|-

|-

Month by Month

October 1973

The Colonels opened their season on October 12, 1973, away from their usual home court at Freedom Hall in Louisville, playing instead in Lexington, Kentucky, where stars Dan Issel and Louie Dampier had played college basketball at the University of Kentucky. In front of 8,727 fans Issel scored 27 points to lead the Colonels to a 111–100 victory over the Denver Rockets. The next night in Louisville the Colonels hosted the Utah Stars and won 103–101 in front of 10,476 fans as Issel scored 36. Issel put in 33 points on October 17 as the Colonels won in front of 5,943 home fans against the Virginia Squires 116–106. October 19 brought a road win against the Carolina Cougars, 121-109 as Issel scored 30. The following night saw a rematch of the two teams in front of 7,026 fans in Louisville with the Cougars prevailing 105-102 despite Issel's 29 points. October 24 brought a 100–98 home win against the New York Nets. On October 26 the Colonels won on the road against the Virginia Squires; Louie Dampier's 21 points led Kentucky to a 104–99 victory. The next night in Louisville, Issel's 31 led the Colonels to a 90–87 win against the Denver Rockets in front of 7,223 fans. The Colonels closed out the month with a runaway win at home against the San Diego Conquistadors, 146–105; 7,412 saw Dan Issel lead all scorers with 25. The Colonels closed the first month of the season with 8 wins and 1 loss (.889).

November 1973

On November 2 the Colonels notched a road win against the New York Nets, 121–109; John Roche led all scorers with 41 points before 8,678 fans. The two teams met again the next night in Louisville and the Colonels prevailed again, 93–87; the 11,277 fans in attendance saw Roche and Dan Issel lead all scorers with 29 apiece. On November 7 the Colonels hosted the Memphis Tams; attendance was 6,834 as Kentucky won 113-89 behind Issel's 30 points. On November 9 the Colonels hosted the Carolina Cougars in Cincinnati; 6,194 saw the Cougars win 139–110. The next night in Louisville Issel's 31 points led Kentucky to victory over the Virginia Squires 111-107 before 7,988 fans. November 14 saw a rematch with the Carolina Cougars in Louisville and the Colonels again came out on the short end, 107–102, despite Issel's 27 points before 8,121 fans.

November 17 saw the host Colonels defeat the rival Indiana Pacers 100–96; 13,766 turned out for the rivalry game as Issel put in 28 points. On November 21 the Colonels hosted the Virginia Squires in Lexington with 7,656 in attendance and Kentucky won 145-115 despite George Gervin's 31 points. On November 23 the Colonels lost 118–114 on the road to the Indiana Pacers as George McGinnis put in 37 points with 10,079 on hand. The next night the Colonels held court in Cincinnati again and defeated the San Diego Conquistadors 124-121 before 3,421 fans; Dan Issel and Artis Gilmore each score 30 for Kentucky. On November 26 the Colonels' home court was in Bowling Green, Kentucky (in the home gym of Western Kentucky University) and 10,453 turned out to see Kentucky lose their third straight to the Carolina Cougars, 94–82, despite Issel's game-high 27. On November 28 the Colonels drew a capacity crowd (10,146) in the San Diego Conquistadors' home gym and though Issel led all scorers with 36 the Conquistadors won 104–99. The next evening saw the Colonels on the road again, squaring off against the Memphis Tams; Issel scored 32 in front of 5,106 fans and Kentucky won 102–92.  The Colonels ended their month on November 30 before 3,116 fans in Cincinnati, losing to the Indiana Pacers 107-104 despite Issel's 31.

The Colonels went 8–6 in November, making it the franchise's worst month in quite some time. Their record for the season dropped to 16-7 (.696).

December 1973

On December 1 the Colonels lost in Charlotte, North Carolina, to the Carolina Cougars, 120–113; 6,231 attended and Dan Issel and Billy Cunningham led all scorers with 21 each. The Colonels returned to action on December 7, losing on the road to the Indiana Pacers 105-97 before 8,079 fans despite Issel's game-high 28. The next night in Cincinnati the Colonels lost to the New York Nets 102–87; 4,951 saw Julius Erving and Louie Dampier lead all scorers with 27 each. Kentucky's next game was a road win against the San Antonio Spurs, breaking a four-game losing streak; Dan Issel had a game-high 28 before 7,674 spectators. The Colonels next hosted a game in Cincinnati on December 14, defeating the Memphis Tams 115-94 despite Johnny Neumann's 25; attendance was 2,164, a very low total for Kentucky. The next night in Denver the Colonels defeated the Denver Rockets 120–114; Dan Issel poured in 46 points before 3,890 fans. The next night, December 16, saw Kentucky win on the road 106–101 against the San Diego Conquistadors despite Stew Johnson's game-high 43 for San Diego before 1,764 fans.

The Colonels returned to action on December 19, losing a close one on the road to the New York Nets 83–82; Julius Erving led all scorers with 30 and 7,493 attended. December 21 saw the Colonels lose at home 86–85; Willie Wise put in 29 before 9,102 in Freedom Hall. The next night the two teams met again, this time in the Stars' home arena, the Salt Palace; Utah won again, 86-82 and Willie Wise had a game-high 25 before 6,341 fans. The next night, December 23, saw Kentucky notch a road win against the San Diego Conquistadors, 123–120; 2,368 saw Dan Issel score 31. On December 26 the Colonels manhandled their rivals, the Indiana Pacers, 106–78 in Louisville before 10,811 as Issel put scored a game-high 28. The following evening Kentucky lost before 3,133 fans in Cincinnati to the Denver Rockets, 105–100, despite Artis Gilmore's game-high 29. December 29 saw the Colonels run away with an easy road win against the Memphis Tams, 145–101; Dan Issel had 30 points before a meager crowd of 1,885.

The Colonels split their December games evenly, with 7 wins and 7 losses, their worst month in quite some time. This left their season record at 23-14 (.622) heading into calendar year 1974.

January 1974

February 1974

March 1974

Playoffs
Eastern Division Semifinals

Colonels win series, 4–0

Eastern Division Finals

Colonels lose series, 0–4

Player statistics

Legend

Season

Playoffs

Awards and records

Awards

 Louie Dampier, All-Star selection
 Dan Issel, All-Star selection
 Artis Gilmore, All-Star selection
 Babe McCarthy, 1974 ABA All-Star Game (head coach, Eastern)
 Artis Gilmore All-Star Game MVP
 Artis Gilmore, First Team All-ABA
 Artis Gilmore, ABA All-Defensive Team
 Dan Issel, All-ABA Second Team
 Louie Dampier, All-ABA Second Team
 Babe McCarthy, ABA Coach of the Year Award (along with Utah Stars' Joe Mullaney)

Records

 Louie Dampier, highest 3 point field goal percentage (.387), 1973–74 season
 Artis Gilmore, most minutes played (3502), 1973–74 season
 Artis Gilmore, most rebounds per game (18.3), 1973–74 season
 Artis Gilmore, most blocked shots per game (3.42), 1973–74 season
 Artis Gilmore: February 3, 1974: most rebounds in one game (40) in ABA history:
 Artis Gilmore: February 3, 1974: most defensive rebounds in one game (34) in ABA history
 April 5, 1974: most errors (turnovers) in an ABA playoff game: 37 (Kentucky (99), at Carolina Cougars (96))

Transactions

Drafts Special S and preseason signings

The Colonels drafted Ernie DiGregorio in the special circumstance draft but he signed with the NBA's Buffalo Braves. The Colonels also drafted M.L. Carr and Ron Behagen but Carr stayed in college and Behagen signed with the NBA's Kansas City-Omaha Kings. Prior to the season head coach Joe Mullaney left to coach the Utah Stars and was replaced by Babe McCarthy; at the end of the season McCarthy, despite being named ABA Coach of the Year, was fired and eventually replaced by Hubie Brown who went on to win the 1975 ABA Finals in his first season.

Trades

 January 1974: the Colonels traded Jim O'Brien and a first round draft pick to the San Diego Conquistadors for Red Robbins and Chuck Williams
 January 1974: the Colonels traded Rick Mount to the Utah Stars for a draft choice and cash
 January 24, 1974: the Colonels traded Mike Gale and Wendell Ladner to the New York Nets for John Roche

References

 Colonels on Basketball Reference

External links
 RememberTheABA.com 1973-74 regular season and playoff results
 RememberTheABA.com Kentucky Colonels page
 RememberTheABA.com 1973-74 game by game results

Kentucky Colonels seasons
Kentucky
Kentucky Colonels, 1973-74
Kentucky Colonels, 1973-74